Syllis curticirris is a species of polychaete in the genus in the genus Syllis. It is found in the Western Indian Ocean off the coast of Tanzania.

References 

Animals described in 1937
Syllidae